Delft National Park is a national park on the island of Neduntivu (Delft) in northern Sri Lanka, approximately  south west of Jaffna.

History

An Integrated Strategic Environmental Assessment of Northern Province produced by the government with the assistance of United Nations Development Programme and United Nations Environment Programme and published in October 2014 recommended that a national park with an area of  be created on a part of Delft island. In May 2015 the government announced that a part of Delft, along with Adam's Bridge, Chundikkulam and Madhu Road would be designated national parks.

Flora and fauna
Delft island is the only place in the world with wild ponies. They are believed to have been brought to the island by the Portuguese.

References

2015 establishments in Sri Lanka
Delft DS Division
National parks of Sri Lanka
Protected areas established in 2015
Protected areas in Northern Province, Sri Lanka